Taiwo Olubowale Allimi (born December 17, 1944 in Sagamu, Nigeria), is a Nigerian journalist and media executive.

Early life and education

Allimi was born on December 17, 1944 in Sagamu, Nigeria.

Career

He was director-general of Voice of Nigeria from 1999 to 2004, the chairman of Nigeria’s 2003, 2007 & 2007 presidential election debates on radio, television and satellites Abuja. Former chairman of the Broadcasting Organizations of Nigeria (BON), the umbrella association for all radio and television stations in Nigeria both public and privately owned stations, 1999-2004. Nigeria’s longest serving state commissioner of information, social welfare, youth, sports and culture, Ogun state, Nigeria – 1986-1991. Former vice president, Commonwealth Broadcasting Association (CBA), London– 2004. Founding member, global media aids initiative with Kofi Annan as chairman, UN New York, January 2004. He was author and initiator of the village-square-meeting concept for bottom-up approach and participatory governance towards sustainable human development in Nigeria, 1986. Founder and principal author of Nigeria’s model TV networks-Lagos television / Lagos weekend television, 1980-85. State delegate, Nigeria’s national political reform conference – 2005 – towards a new constitution for Nigeria. coordinator, Ogun State elders’ consultative forum, a non-partisan advisory group offering insight, guidance and direction on the weighty issues of contemporary governance in Ogun state, south west Nigeria – 2005 to date. other states and Africa (with dr. nelson Mandela) have copied the Ogun state model. He was the leading advocate for the establishment of indigenous community broadcasting system as the third-tier of broadcasting in Nigeria since 1992. He was the initiator, host and producer of Vote ‘83, the most celebrated TV elections coverage in Nigeria, 1983. Initiator, host and producer of Elections ‘79, Nigeria’s first television elections coverage on Nigerian television authority – NTA channel 10, Lagos, 1979. Chairman, plenary session, UNECA conference on “Putting development at the heart of broadcasting”, Addis Ababa, April 2003. He was a speaker on “Broadcasting and HIV/AIDS” at the World Electronic Media Forum, Geneva, Switzerland, 8–12 December 2003. First Nigerian TV journalist to introduce editorial opinion series Issues of our Time on Nigerian television, 1982. Initiator, host and producer of Lagos Report''' Nigeria’s award-winning television weeknight investigative series, on Nigerian television in 1977. Author of Without Time: Memoirs of a Journalist in Public Service'', published in April 1999. Aremo Taiwo Allimi principal consultant of Talim Associates Nigeria limited, a firm of media, research, broadcasting and communications development consultants, founded in 1986.

References

1944 births
Living people
Yoruba journalists
Nigerian television journalists
Nigerian media executives
People from Sagamu